The Gulf Club Champions Cup, is a football league tournament for the Arabian Peninsula, it's a tournament for clubs. The 1993 edition was known as the Gulf Cooperation Council Club Tournament.

The tournament doubled up as the qualifying round of the 1993–94 Asian Club Championship. The winners would progress to the ACC's latter stages.

Results

All match were played in Saudi Arabia.

Winner

 
 

GCC Champions League